The two-woman competition in bobsleigh at the 2022 Winter Olympics was held on 18 February (heats 1 and 2) and 19 February (heats 3 and 4),  at the Xiaohaituo Bobsleigh and Luge Track in Yanqing District of Beijing. Laura Nolte and Deborah Levi of Germany won the event, the first Olympic medal for them. Mariama Jamanka and Alexandra Burghardt, also of Germany, won the silver medal, and Elana Meyers Taylor and Sylvia Hoffman, of the United States, bronze.

Jamanka was the defending champion, Meyers Taylor and Kaillie Humphries were the 2018 silver and bronze medalists, respectively. All of them were competing, though in 2022 Humphries represented the United States. Humphries was the 2021 World champion. Stephanie Schneider and Nolte were the silver and bronze medalists, respectively. Meyers Taylor was the winner of the 2021–22 Bobsleigh World Cup, ahead of Humphries.

In both runs of the first day, Nolte and Deborah Levi set track records. After two runs, they had advantage of half a second over Jamanka and Alexandra Burghardt, who were second in both runs. Meyers Taylor and Sylvia Hoffman were third in both runs, very close to Jamanka and Burghardt. In the third run, Nolte and Levi set the track record again, and even though they lost 0.01 in the fourth run to Jamanka and Burghardt, they won gold with the advantage of 0.77.

Qualification

There was a quota of 20 sleds available for the women's two-women event. Qualification was based on the world rankings of the 2021/2022 season between 15 October 2020 and 16 January 2022. Pilots must have competed in six different races on three different tracks and be ranked in at least five of those races. Additionally, the pilot must been ranked among the top 50 for the man's events or top 40 for the women's events.

For the women's races the IBSF combined ranking will be used for the quotas involving multiple sleds. The top two nations in the two-women event earned three sleds each. The next four nations earned two sleds each, while the next six earned one sled each. The IBSF announced final quotas on January 24, 2022.

Summary

Results

References

Bobsleigh at the 2022 Winter Olympics
Women's events at the 2022 Winter Olympics